Richard Sprenger is a food safety expert and author of a number of books and many interactive training presentations on the topic of food safety and hygiene. His commentary on food safety has featured in media in the Middle East such as The National and the Khaleej Times. He contributes regularly at such events as the Dubai International Food Safety Conferences, which are held annually across that Middle East and also speaks at events such as the annual Food Chain Conferences in Doha.

Career
Sprenger started his career in food safety in 1973 when he qualified as an Environmental Health Officer. At the age of 38 he became a Director of Doncaster Metropolitan Borough Council’s (one of the UK's largest local authorities) multidisciplinary Directorate of Environmental Services.

In 1990 Sprenger became the first environmental health officer appointed as a member of the UK Government Advisory Committee on the Microbiological Safety of Food and a member of the Salmonella in Eggs sub-committee. He was also a Local Authorities Coordinator of Regulatory Services (LACORS) advisor and Chair of the LACORS Food Poisoning Working Group.

Sprenger is a fellow of the Society of Food Hygiene Technology (SOFHT), the Royal Environmental Health Institute of Scotland and the Chartered Institute of Environmental Health (CIEH). He has worked closely with large organisations to develop food safety management systems and training programmes, including CWS Retail Services, Marks & Spencer, McDonald's, The De Vere Group, WRVS, Shell Retail International, HM Prison Catering Services and Gala Retail Services (Ireland). He has provided advice and consultancy services to Governments including the UK Food Standards Agency (The training of Environmental Health Officers regarding the enforcement of the food safety management system for small businesses), such as Safer Food Better Business and the Ministry of Health in Bahrain.

He was the founder member of the Institute of Environmental Health Officer's Food Hygiene Education Working group. In 1982 the CIEH used Sprenger's Basic and Advanced Food Safety courses he had developed in King's Lynn and with a few minor amendments these became the most popular food safety courses in the UK.He started Highfield.

Sprenger regularly speaks at international conferences. He has been involved in assisting in the training of environmental health officers in the UK, Ireland, Malta, Dubai, Cyprus, Mauritius and the Seychelles. In 2011 he held a workshop in Dubai. His specialist subjects include food safety management, food poisoning investigations, the training of food handlers and enforcement officers, auditing and inspection and HACCP/Food Safety management programmes.

Sprenger has been  based in Dubai since 2010 where he was, at the request of the Dubai Municipality and working closely with Bobby Krishna (the Senior Food Studies and Surveys Officer with the Food Control Department of the Dubai Municipality. responsible for the development and implementation of the Person in Charge Programme. He has also helped run several workshops in Dubai for all stakeholders involved with the PIC programme. In January 2011 this certification programme became compulsory for all food businesses who must have at least one Certified person in charge (PIC) who has been trained in food safety. Sprenger has been responsible for delivering "train the trainer" sessions to over 130 food safety trainers and Dubai Food Inspectors who are responsible for delivering PIC training. In 2011 Sprenger and Bobby Krishna developed the original PIC Handbook and Sprenger designed all of the original PIC training materials including interactive PowerPoint presentations for both Level 2 and Level 3.

Around 12,000 supervisors and managers are trained as PICs each year  and, according to Sprenger, highlights the importance of protecting consumers. and according to Sprenger, this is one of the world's leading initiatives concerned with improving food safety and protecting consumers.

Publications

References

Living people
Year of birth missing (living people)
Food safety